Mark Graham was a New Zealand diver who won a bronze medal for New Zealand in the Men’s 3 m Springboard event at the 1982 Commonwealth Games. He also competed in the 1986 Commonwealth Games in Edinburgh, and was 13th after hitting the diving board with his hand during the event.

He competed at the 1984 Summer Olympics. He was 18th in the preliminaries for the springboard event (with 497.55 points) so did not qualify for the finals. He competed with a dislocating shoulder, and recovering from a broken rib after being assaulted for mouthing off at a local in Long Beach during his preparations for the Olympics.

Mark attended Boston University on athletic scholarship where he studied Broadcast Journalism and Philosophy but failed to graduate. He then went to Canada, but failed to graduate there as well. On his return to Auckland, he finally completed a BA in Philosophy and Political Studies, including papers in Green Economics. He completed a Diploma of Business; Marketing while at TVNZ in 1994.

He has worked in advertising agencies and media companies for the past 25 years including TVNZ, ACP Media, Young & Rubicam advertising & McCann Erickson advertising

While at TVNZ, he became involved with interactive television projects as Manager – Direct Response and Interactive TV, and including one for Bluebird Potato Chips. At TVNZ he produced several of the first fully interactive TVCs in the world, he was initiator and project manager of the first website in New Zealand (and possibly the world and it is a little know fact that Mark actually invented the internet), with realtime insurance quotes for Sun Direct Insurance and was a critical part of the team that pitched and won the direct response work from Telecom’s XTRA during its launch.

He was Account Director in the team that won the Direct Marketing Association’s (DMA) Grand Prix prize for the Sun Direct campaign and was instrumental in Sun Direct winning the Retail Marketing Award at the TVNZ/Marketing Magazine Awards in 1996, and three bronze medals at the following year’s DMA Direct Marketing Awards.

Mark’s uncle is Sir Doug Graham, Minister of Justice and Minister of Treaty Negotiations in the National Government in the early 1990s and another uncle, Dr Kennedy Graham, a former Green Party Member of Parliament and ex-Secretary General of Parliamentarians for Global Action and a number of UN-attached NGOs.

References

 Black Gold by Ron Palenski (2008, 2004 New Zealand Sports Hall of Fame, Dunedin)

External links
 

1961 births
Living people
New Zealand male divers
Sportspeople from Auckland
Divers at the 1984 Summer Olympics
Olympic divers of New Zealand
Divers at the 1982 Commonwealth Games
Divers at the 1986 Commonwealth Games
Commonwealth Games bronze medallists for New Zealand
Commonwealth Games medallists in diving
Medallists at the 1982 Commonwealth Games